Upper Blandford is a small  community in the Canadian province of Nova Scotia, located in the Chester Municipal District on the Aspotogan Peninsula on the Lighthouse Route (Nova Scotia Route 329).

References
Upper Blandford on Destination Nova Scotia

Communities in Lunenburg County, Nova Scotia
General Service Areas in Nova Scotia